The Office of the Quartet (OQ) was established in East Jerusalem in 2002 by the Quartet on the Middle East, consisting of the United Nations, the European Union, the United States and Russia, with a mandate to help mediate Middle East peace negotiations while supporting Palestinian economic development and institution building.

History 
Between 2007-2015, the Office was known as the Office of the Quartet Representative and at the time was established to support Tony Blair, the former prime minister of the United Kingdom.

On April 24, 2014, at a State Department event, Secretary of State John Kerry and then Quartet Representative Tony Blair appointed De Boer Head of Mission with a specific mandate to implement the Initiative of the Palestinian Economy. De Boer has given several interviews about his role, including one with the YPO, in which he said the two-state solution is the only viable solution. In an interview with CNBC, he talked about Office of the Quartet's role in economic development, and said the Office and a new, related nonprofit deal catalyst, Shurook, want to find $1 billion in outside investment for the Palestinian economy. The Office works with the Palestinian and Israeli governments to create pro-investment policies and win permissions for specific projects, he said. "We do the pre-development work before an investor feels comfortable that they can make an investment," he said.

In June 2015, Tony Blair resigned as Quartet Representative. Following Blair's resignation, the position of Quartet Representative was not replaced and the Office of the Quartet Representative transitioned into what is now the Office of the Quartet. The Office now reports to the Quartet Members with a mandate to increase Palestinian economic and institutional development and empowerment to support achieving a two-state solution.

Strategic Principles
The OQ works in the major areas of energy, water, rule of law, movement and trade and telecommunication as well as economic mapping. The OQ is committed in engaging and keeping with the following strategic principles:

1. To play a catalytic role in working towards sectoral solutions while partnering with other actors and taking on direct responsibility for specific elements of those solutions (when the office is well positioned and requested to do so). Particular attention is paid to policies and projects that have a multiplier effect i.e. with an outcome that extends beyond the narrow output of the policy or project;

2. To focus on implementation of agreements reached and announcements made by the parties, to ensure that they are translated as quickly as possible into results that have a positive impact in people's lives;

3. To bridge between the parties and providing creative solutions that enable progress on the ground;

4. To maintain the vertical depth of its work from the most granular, technical level to the strategic and political level while engaging the broad array of actors required to make progress, including the parties, members of the international community and others;

5. To ensure complementarity of its work with that of other key actors, including those which also play a convening role.

Funding 
The Office has been funded by contributions, including from the Netherlands, the United Kingdom, the European Union, the United States, Japan, Canada and New Zealand.

Current Focus Areas 
Energy Sector : developing and supporting initiatives, policies and projects that address the full generation-transmission-distribution cycle and that contribute to establishing a unified and economically viable sector. This holistic approach incorporates the following mutually re-enforcing sub-objectives:

 Increasing and diversifying the generation and supply of energy
 Enabling infrastructure
 Supporting commercial viability

Water Sector: the OQ supports the address of essential civilian needs, the mitigation of environmental challenges, the enabling of economic development while contributing to a fully functioning sector. Through its holistic approach, the OQ works with the parties and the international community in advancing the development of the water and the wastewater sectors, by focusing its attention on three interdependent elements:

 Securing a reliable water supply
 Enhancing water and wastewater infrastructure
 Ensuring the commercial and financial viability of the water sector

Rule of Law Sector : As part of its mandate, the OQ aims to 'address Palestinian institutional governance needs focusing as a matter of urgency on the rule of law.’ For this, the rule of law team works closely with the parties and relevant stakeholders, bridging between them as appropriate, while pursuing the office's holistic and integrated approach through its focus in three mutually reinforcing objectives:

 Strengthening the security sector
 Strengthening the justice sector
 Enhancing fiscal and financial stability

Movement and Trade Sector: In its work, the OQ supports the sustainability of the Palestinian economy by enhancing trade and movement of people. By its partnership with relevant parties, the Movement and Trade team currently focuses on three main work streams as set out below:

 Expanding access of Palestinian Products to New Markets
 Improving the Traveler and Trading Experience at Allenby/King Hussein Bridge (A/KHB)
 Trade Facilitation to Reduce Transportation Costs

Telecommunication Sector : The OQ's work in this sector engages with the parties and the relevant stakeholders by supporting the deployment of advanced mobile communications services such as 4G/5G in the West Bank and 3G/4G services in Gaza  thus focusing its work on supporting to address three main challenges:

 To improve access to the radio spectrum
 To facilitate import of equipment and
 To enable the entry of materials and construction of infrastructure.

Economic Mapping : The OQ, in close collaboration with the Palestinian Authority, the Palestinian Central Bureau of Statistics, and relevant ministries, is building an interactive web-based economic map of the West Bank and Gaza. The mapping tool   is intended to visualize critical data relevant to economic, geographic, social, security, and legal spheres. The purpose of the web-based tool is to empower Palestinian government agencies and institutions as well as the private sector, nongovernmental and international organizations with online datasets, maps, visuals, dashboards, and analytics to support informed policy-making and business decisions to support further strategic economic development.

The Office Heads of Mission 

 Robert Danin: April 2008 – August 2010.
 Gary Grappo: September 2010 – November 2011.
Firas Ra'ad:  June 2012 – December 2013.
 Kito de Boer: January 2015 – June 2017.
 John N. Clarke: July 2017 – present.

References

Israeli–Palestinian peace process